TCAP may refer to:

Science
 Acetone peroxide, the trimer version tri-cyclic acetone peroxide, a high explosive
 Telethonin, a protein encoded by the TCAP gene

Education
 Tennessee Comprehensive Assessment Program, a public school standardized testing program
 Transitional Colorado Assessment Program, a public school standardized testing program that replaced the Colorado Student Assessment Program

Finance
 Tax Credit Assistance Program, a U.S. federal housing grant program
 Thanachart Capital PCL (stock ticker: TCAP), the holding company of TBank, the Thanachart Bank

Other uses
 Taipei Children's Amusement Park, an amusement park in Taipei, Taiwan
 To Catch a Predator, American reality television news segment of Dateline NBC, which used hidden cameras to catch child sex predators
 Transaction Capabilities Application Part (ITU-T Q.771-Q.775 or ANSI T1.114) a protocol to allow multiple simultaneous dialogs on the same subsystem
 Catholic Tercio of Political Action Party (Spanish: TCAP) a local political party in Madrid in 2007, see Results breakdown of the 2007 Spanish local elections (Community of Madrid)

See also

 
 Traverse City Area Public Schools (TCAPS)